Shorea virescens is a species of plant in the family Dipterocarpaceae. The inference of the species name, derived from Latin ( = becoming green), is unclear. This species occurs in Borneo and the Philippines.

Description

Shorea virescens is found in at least two protected areas (Lambir & Gunung Mulu National Parks), but is threatened elsewhere due to habitat loss.

Wood
It is a light hardwood sold under the trade names of white meranti.

References

virescens
Trees of Borneo
Trees of the Philippines
Vulnerable plants